Wild Life is the debut studio album by the British–American rock band Wings and the third studio album by Paul McCartney after the breakup of the Beatles. The album was recorded in eight days, from 25 July to 2 August 1971, at EMI Studios (now Abbey Road Studios) by McCartney, his wife Linda, session drummer Denny Seiwell, whom they had worked with on the McCartneys' previous album Ram, and guitarist Denny Laine, formerly of the English rock band the Moody Blues. It was released by Apple Records on 7 December in the UK and US, to lukewarm critical and commercial reaction.

Recording
In July 1971, with a fresh set of McCartney tunes, the newly formed Wings recorded the album in slightly more than a week with the mindset that it had to be instant and raw in order to capture the freshness and vitality of a live studio recording. Five of the eight songs were recorded in one take. Paul McCartney later cited the quick recording schedule of Bob Dylan as an inspiration for this. The first session was held at Abbey Road Studios on 25 July. Footage of McCartney playing "Bip Bop" and "Hey Diddle" from around this time was later included in the made-for-TV film Wings Over the World.

The album was rehearsed at McCartney's recording studio in Scotland dubbed Rude Studio, which Paul and Linda had used to make demos of songs that would be used in the album, and recorded at Abbey Road with Tony Clark and Alan Parsons engineering. Paul had lead vocal parts on all tracks, sharing those duties with Linda on "I Am Your Singer" and "Some People Never Know". "Tomorrow" features background vocals from Denny Laine and Linda McCartney.

After the rehearsals at Rude, the recording moved to Abbey Road Studios, where the album was completed in a few weeks. According to drummer Denny Seiwell, five of the eight recorded tracks were done in one take. One almost definite example of this is "Mumbo", the opener on the album. According to Clark, they were just jamming and Clark decided to start recording. McCartney, upon noticing, shouted "Take it, Tony" and started ad-libbing lyrics.

On the promotional album The Complete Audio Guide to the Alan Parsons Project, Parsons discusses how he did a rough mix of "I Am Your Singer" that Paul liked so much, he used it for the final mix on the album.

Music and lyrics
"Dear Friend", recorded during the Ram sessions, was apparently an attempt at reconciliation with John Lennon. It followed Lennon's attack on McCartney in the song "How Do You Sleep?", from the album Imagine, which had been in retaliation for McCartney's perceived digs at Lennon in "Too Many People" on Ram. Music critic Ian MacDonald cited "Dear Friend" as a counter-argument to the caricature of McCartney as an emotional lightweight.

Wild Life also included a reggae remake of Mickey & Sylvia's 1957 top 40 hit "Love Is Strange". A promotional single was distributed in the UK by Apple in December 1971 with catalogue No. R5932, but the commercial release was cancelled due to poor album sales.

Release and reception

After announcing to the media the band's formation on 2 August 1971, the group were named "Wings" on 9 October. On 8 November, the group held a press party in London to announce both the group and Wild Life, which was released on 7 December, in both the UK and US, to lukewarm critical and commercial reaction. The album reached number 11 in the UK and number 10 in the US, where it went gold. At the same press party, in an interview with Melody Maker, McCartney said that the group should soon be performing live. John Mendelsohn wrote in Rolling Stone that he wondered whether the album may have been "deliberately second-rate." In The Beatles: An Illustrated Record, Roy Carr and Tony Tyler called the album "rushed, defensive, badly timed, and over-publicized" and wrote that it showed McCartney's songwriting "at an absolute nadir just when he needed a little respect". The liner notes for Wild Life (and on the Thrillington album) were credited to Clint Harrigan, but in 1990 McCartney admitted to journalist Peter Palmiere that he was Harrigan. Lennon claimed to know the identity of Harrigan during their Melody Maker feud in 1972.

In December 1971, a Ram outtake "Breakfast Blues" was mixed by Paul and Linda at A&R Studios. "Breakfast Blues" was played on WCBS-FM, where McCartney promoted Wings and Wild Life, on 15 December. The track was later released as "Great Cock and Seagull Race" on the 2012 special edition of Ram.

The album was first released on CD by EMI's budget Fame label, on 5 October 1987. In addition to naming the previously hidden tracks ("Bip Bop Link" and "Mumbo Link"), this edition added "Oh Woman, Oh Why" (the B-side of "Another Day"), "Mary Had a Little Lamb" and "Little Woman Love" as bonus tracks. In 1993, Wild Life was remastered and reissued on CD as part of 'The Paul McCartney Collection' series with singles "Give Ireland Back to the Irish" and "Mary Had a Little Lamb" as well as B-sides "Little Woman Love" and "Mama's Little Girl"—all recorded in 1972 except for "Little Woman Love", which was a Ram outtake ("Oh Woman, Oh Why" appeared separately as a bonus track on the 1993 reissue of Ram).  A version recorded in the garden of Paul's Scotland home circa June 1971 of the bluegrass-styled "Bip Bop" featured Paul and Linda's daughter Mary giggling in the background, and segued into a riff called "Hey Diddle". This surfaced in 2001 on the compilation Wingspan: Hits and History.

In 2007, Paul McCartney's catalogue was released on iTunes. Wild Life received an instrumental version of "Give Ireland Back to the Irish" (originally released as b-side of the single) as a bonus track.

In 2018, Wild Life was reissued as part of the Paul McCartney Archive Collection. The bonus tracks included the single "Give Ireland Back to the Irish" and its instrumental b-side, promo single edit of "Love Is Strange" and a number of home demos and studio outtakes, including unedited home performances of "Bip Bop" and "Hey Diddle", previously released on Wingspan: Hits and History.

Track listing
All tracks written by Paul and Linda McCartney, except "Love is Strange" written by Mickey Baker, Sylvia Vanderpool, and Ethel Smith.

Side one
 "Mumbo" – 3:54
 "Bip Bop" – 4:14
 "Love Is Strange" – 4:50
 "Wild Life" – 6:48

Side two
 "Some People Never Know" – 6:35
 "I Am Your Singer" – 2:15
 "Bip Bop (Link)" – 0:52
 "Tomorrow" – 3:28
 "Dear Friend" – 5:53
 "Mumbo (Link)" – 0:46

Notes: "Bip Bop (Link)" and "Mumbo (Link)" are unlisted on pressings of the album released before 1987.
Track two, "Bip Bop", is a monaural recording.

Archive Collection Reissue

Wild Life was remastered and released as part of the Paul McCartney Archive Collection on 7 December 2018. Several editions of the remastered album were released. The following track list represents the Deluxe Edition with three CDs and a DVD. The Special Edition and double LP versions compiled the remastered album (CD1) and bonus tracks (CD3).

Track listing

All tracks written by Paul and Linda McCartney, except "Love is Strange" written by Mickey Baker, Sylvia Vanderpool, and Ethel Smith, and "Good Rockin' Tonight" written by Roy Brown.

CD1: Remastered album
 "Mumbo" – 3:58
 "Bip Bop" – 4:10
 "Love Is Strange" – 4:52
 "Wild Life" – 6:41
 "Some People Never Know" – 6:37
 "I Am Your Singer" – 2:19
 "Bip Bop (Link)" – 0:52
 "Tomorrow" – 3:28
 "Dear Friend" – 6:00
 "Mumbo (Link)" – 0:46

CD2: Rough mixes
 "Mumbo" – 3:58
 "Bip Bop" – 4:22
 "Love Is Strange" – 4:27
 "Wild Life" – 6:41
 "Some People Never Know" – 6:44
 "I Am Your Singer" – 2:18
 "Tomorrow" – 3:36
 "Dear Friend" – 5:53

CD3: Bonus tracks
"Good Rockin' Tonight"  – 0:58
"Bip Bop"  – 3:17
"Hey Diddle"  – 2:33
"She Got It Good"  – 0:44
"I Am Your Singer"  – 2:53
"Outtake I" – 0:29
"Dear Friend"  – 4:49
"Dear Friend"  – 2:02
"Outtake II" – 0:13
"Indeed I Do" – 1:14
"When the Wind Is Blowing" – 3:51
"The Great Cock and Seagull Race"  – 4:02
"Outtake III" – 0:10
"Give Ireland Back to the Irish" – 3:44
"Give Ireland Back to the Irish"  – 3:46
"Love Is Strange"  – 4:14
"African Yeah Yeah" – 2:44

DVD: Bonus video
"Scotland, 1971"
"The Ball"
"ICA Rehearsals"
"Give Ireland Back to the Irish Rehearsal"

PaulMcCartney.com free download
 "Dear Friend"  – 5:59

Personnel
Paul McCartney – lead vocals, bass guitar, electric guitar, piano, keyboards, recorder, percussion
Linda McCartney – co-lead vocals , keyboards, piano, percussion, backing vocals
Denny Laine – guitars, bass guitar, percussion, keyboards, backing vocals
Denny Seiwell – drums, percussion
Alan Parsons and Tony Clark – engineering

Charts and certifications

Weekly charts

Year-end charts

Certifications

References
Footnotes

Citations

Sources

External links

1971 debut albums
Apple Records albums
Paul McCartney and Wings albums
Albums produced by Paul McCartney
Albums produced by Linda McCartney